Brudzowice  is a village in the administrative district of Gmina Siewierz, within Będzin County, Silesian Voivodeship, in southern Poland. The village has a population of 1,221.

References

External links
 

Brudzowice